Anton 'Klin' Ostrovsky (born on 6 June 1982) is an Israeli actor and rap singer.

Biography
Anton was born in Novocherkassk, Rostov Oblast, USSR (now Russia) in 1982 as the eldest son.

He visited Israel at age 14 in one of the frames of the Jewish Agency for Israel. In 1997, his family immigrated to Israel and lived in Ma'aleh Adumim.

He is founder of the rap group, "Sadyle" in 2003 and  "Tel-Aviv Hardcore."

Filmography

Cinema
2011: Central Station as Andrei
2011: Question Signs
2011: Barriers (short movie) as Alex
2009: Warning
2009: The Loners as Sacha Blokhin

Television
2012: Merkaz as David
2012: The Gordin Cell as Witzosky
2010: Blue Natalie as Boris
2005: Mummy! as Dima

External links 
 
 הרחוב גידל אותנו באגרופים 

1982 births
Living people
Israeli people of Russian descent
Jewish Israeli male actors
People from Novocherkassk
Russian Jews
Israeli rappers
21st-century Israeli male actors
Male actors from Jerusalem